is a Japanese voice actor and singer. He played Lelouch Lamperouge in Code Geass, Koro-sensei in Assassination Classroom, Ichimatsu in Osomatsu-san, Yuta Togashi in Love, Chunibyo & Other Delusions, Kraft Lawrence in Spice and Wolf, Hero in Maoyu, Kimihiro Watanuki in xxxHOLiC, Joker in Persona 5 and Riku in Yashahime: Princess Half-Demon.

Filmography

TV animation

Original video animation (OVA)

Original net animation (ONA)

Live-Action Drama/Film

Anime films

Video games

 The Japanese vocal tracks for these characters also appear in the Chinese and Korean versions of the game.

Drama CDs

Live-action films

Dubbing

Discography

Jun Fukuyama Persona Show

PONY CANYON

FlyingDog

References

External links
  
 Official agency profile 
 
 

1972 births
Living people
Japanese male pop singers
Japanese male video game actors
Japanese male voice actors
Male voice actors from Hiroshima Prefecture
Male voice actors from Osaka Prefecture
Musicians from Hiroshima Prefecture
Musicians from Osaka Prefecture
People from Fukuyama, Hiroshima
People from Takatsuki, Osaka
Best Actor Seiyu Award winners
Seiyu Award winners
21st-century Japanese singers
21st-century Japanese male singers